Fakenham West railway station was a station in Norfolk. It was built as part of the Midland and Great Northern Joint Railway main line that meandered across Norfolk to Great Yarmouth.

The station was opened by the Lynn and Fakenham Railway on 16 August 1880, when it was originally named Fakenham Town, and was renamed Fakenham by 1910. Following railway nationalisation, it was renamed again to become Fakenham West by British Railways on 27 September 1948. The station was closed on 2 March 1959.

Part of a platform from the station survives outside the car park of the Jewson builder's merchant, and the trackbed south of the platform is visible as a roadway.

The town was served by two stations on separate lines. Fakenham East railway station was on the Great Eastern route between Wells-on-Sea and Wymondham. Currently there are no rail links to Fakenham; however, this may change in the future with the Norfolk Orbital Railway, which would use the proposed new-build station close to the site of Fakenham West.

See also
 List of closed railway stations in Norfolk

References

Disused railway stations in Norfolk
Former Midland and Great Northern Joint Railway stations
Railway stations in Great Britain opened in 1880
Railway stations in Great Britain closed in 1959
Fakenham